Madouba is a department or commune of Kossi Province in western Burkina Faso. Its capital lies at the town of Madouba. According to the 1996 census the department has a total population of 5,949.

Towns and villages

 Madouba	(265 inhabitants) (capital)
 Bankoumani	(599 inhabitants)
 Bokuy	(425 inhabitants)
 Dina	(327 inhabitants)
 Kiko	(368 inhabitants)
 Kolokan	(1 502 inhabitants)
 Pia n°2	(871 inhabitants)
 Poro	(417 inhabitants)
 Touba	(873 inhabitants)
 Yourouna	(302 inhabitants)

References

Departments of Burkina Faso
Kossi Province